Les Chansones Populaires (French for Popular Songs) is the third studio album by the Serbian/Yugoslavian new wave band Električni Orgazam. It was released in 1983 by Jugoton. The album contains nine covers of popular English language songs.

Track listing
Arranged by Električni Orgazam and Piko.

Personnel
Grof (Jovan Jovanović) — bass guitar
Piko (Ivan Stančić) — drums
Ljubomir Jovanović — guitar
Srđan Gojković — guitar, lead vocals
Ljubomir Đukić — piano, synthesizer, vocals

External links

Električni Orgazam albums
1983 albums
Jugoton albums
Albums recorded in Slovenia
Covers albums